The Société de l'assurance automobile du Québec (SAAQ;  Quebec Automobile Insurance Corporation) is a Crown corporation responsible for licensing drivers and vehicles in the province of Quebec and providing public auto insurance which insures all drivers, passengers, pedestrians, bicyclists and motorcyclists involved in road collisions whether or not they are at fault (no-fault insurance). Coverage, however, is limited to personal injuries — damage to property is covered by private insurers.

The SAAQ also administers Quebec's driver's licenses and vehicle licence plates (analogous to the DMVs of many U.S. States), and seeks to prevent road accidents, particularly through advertising campaigns in the media and in schools.

In January 2021, Konrad Sioui became chairman of the board, thereby the first representative of an Indigenous community to head the board of directors of a crown corporation in Quebec.

See also
 Vehicle registration plates of Quebec
Insurance Corporation of British Columbia
Manitoba Public Insurance
Saskatchewan Government Insurance

References

External links
 Société de l'assurance automobile du Québec Official site.
 Official site in English

Financial services companies established in 1978
Crown corporations of Quebec
Motor vehicle registration agencies
Companies based in Quebec City
Government-owned insurance companies of Canada
1978 establishments in Quebec